Cash Converters International Limited (Cash Converters or Cashies) is an Australian ASX-listed personal finance and secondhand retail company headquartered in Perth, Western Australia.

History 
Cash Converters was founded in Perth, Western Australia, in 1984 by Brian Cumins and a group of partners. Within four years, the network had opened a further six outlets across Perth. 

The Company commenced its international expansion in the mid-1990s establishing operations in New Zealand, the United Kingdom (UK), France, Belgium, South Africa, Italy and other markets. As of 30 June 2021, the Company operated 693 stores across 15 countries, with all non-Australian stores managed through franchising agreements.

The group listed on the London Stock Exchange (LSE) in 1995 and was then granted a dual listing on the ASX in February 1997 under the code CCV. In 2001, Cash Converters migrated its primary listing location to the ASX and subsequently delisted from the LSE on 19 February 2013 based on the composition of its share register and low trading volumes in the UK.

Cash Converters made two acquisitions in 2006. The first, Safrock Finance Corporation (Safrock), was completed on 29 September for a total consideration of $17.5 million (including earn out) and the second was financial software platform MON-E for $15 million. Both acquisitions were funded through a combination of cash and shares (scrip).

Cash Converters acquired 80% of vehicle financing company Green Light Auto Group Ltd (GLA) in September 2013 through the conversion of a $4 million loan previously provided to the business. In November 2014, Cash Converters acquired the remaining 20% of GLA, becoming a wholly-owned subsidiary.

In November 2009, EZCorp (NASDAQ:EZPW) purchased a 30% stake in Cash Converters, appointing two representatives to the Board of Directors. Between dividend reinvestments and a rights issue in 2018, EZCorp increased its ownership to 35.65% on 30 June 2021.

Products & Services 

The primary service provided by Cash Converters is personal finance in the form of small amount credit contracts (SACC) up to $2,000 and medium amount credit contracts (MACC) up to $5,000. Both these products are regulated by the National Consumer Credit Act 2009 (NCCP Act) and are available throughout the store network and online to Australian customers. The personal finance business is the largest contributor to Cash Converters total earnings, representing 53% of the Company’s EBITDA for the financial year 2021. 

The second highest earnings contributor for Cash Converters is its corporate-owned store network, which generates income through the sale of second-hand goods, unsecured loans and secured pawnbroking loans. Cash Converters’ franchise network represents 618 stores throughout the globe, including 80 in Australia, and income is generated through royalties paid to the Group by the franchisees.

Secured vehicle financing is provided through GLA – a wholly owned subsidiary – via a network of Australian finance brokers and car dealers. This business unit contributed 16% of Cash Converters EBITDA in financial year 2021.

Class Action lawsuits & Infringements 
Two class actions have been launched in the Federal Court of Australia on allegations that Cash Converters charged excessive fees on short term loans in NSW between July 2010 and June 2013. Over 50,000 customers have joined to seek about $40 million in compensation. A $23 million in-principle settlement was reached with more than 37,000 Cash Converters customers in June 2015.

In 2016, an Australian Securities and Investments Commission (ASIC) investigation found that Cash Converters had failed to make reasonable inquiries into the income and expenses of customers availing their small amount loan product. They were ordered to pay back $10.8 million to consumers and fined a further $1.35 million in addition to entering an Enforceable Undertaking (EU) to uplift its risk, compliance and loan application assessment processes. Cash Converters completed all commitments made to ASIC as part of the EU in February 2018 which included the engagement of Deloitte as an independent expert to review the Company’s updated practices. 

The investigation was part of a wider focus by ASIC on pay day lending in 2016, with lenders Nimble and Fair Go Finance also refunding customers as a result of investigations.

In May 2018, Cash Converters reached a settlement with ASIC relating to debt collections practices between 2013 and March 2016 resulting in a payment of $650,000 to the National Debt Helpline and the outsourcing of debt collection activity to a third-party, Collections House Limited (ASX:CLH) which was completed by 30 June 2018. In 2021, Cash Converters recommenced its own debt collection activity after receiving ASIC approval.

Cash Converters made the final class action settlement payment relating to historic lending practices in September 2020.

References 

Companies listed on the Australian Securities Exchange
Companies based in Perth, Western Australia
Financial services companies established in 1984
Retail companies established in 1984
1984 establishments in Australia
Retail companies of Australia
Pawn shops